Svalbard Bryggeri is a microbrewery in Longyearbyen at the island of Spitsbergen, the archipelago of Svalbard, Norway.  Svalbard Bryggeri at 78° North is the northernmost commercial brewery in the world.

Establishing a brewery on the Svalbard archipelago required a change of Norwegian law, which prohibited commercial production of alcoholic beverages there. This meant that production was only started as late as 2015, after the law was changed by the Storting and an Italian supplier of equipment delivered and installed them.

The brew is characterized by that 16% of the water used for brewing are thawed ice from the 2,000 year old Bogerbreen glacier.  Beverage cans from Svalbard brewery are distributed throughout the mainland Norway and an increasing share is exported. The brewery also offers beer tastings for visitors to Longyearbyen.

Products 

 Spitsbergen IPA
 Spitsbergen Pale ale
 Spitsbergen Pilsner
 Spitsbergen Stout
 Spitsbergen Weißbier
 Spitsbergen Rav Lager
 Spitsbergen Blonde

References

External links 
 Official website, English language version

Companies based in Svalbard
Longyearbyen
Breweries in Norway
Norwegian companies established in 2015